The Managed Risk Medical Insurance Board (MRMIB) of California is a component of the California Health and Human Services Agency.

Programs administered by the Board include:

 the California Major Risk Medical Insurance Program
 the California Healthy Families Program
 the Access for Infants and Mothers Program (AIM) which provides comprehensive coverage for children who do not have employer-sponsored insurance and do not qualify for no-cost Medi-Cal

External links 
 
 Major Risk Medical Insurance Board in the California Code of Regulations

State agencies of California
Welfare in California